Grand Ayatollah Sayyid Mohammad Ali Hosseini Alavi Gorgani (March 1940 – 15 March 2022) was an Iranian Twelver Shi'a marja.

He was born in a religious family in Najaf, Iraq. He rose to a leading scholar in Najaf, and moved to Qom after the fall of Pahlavi Iran in 1979. Ayatollah Alavi Gorgani studied under the late Ayatollah Bourujerdi, Ayatollah Khomeni, Ayatollah Mohammad Ali Araki, and Ayatollah Golpaygani.

Alavi Gorgani died on 15 March 2022.

See also
 Reza Ostadi
 List of Marjas
 Hashemi Rafsanjani

References

1940 births
2022 deaths
Iranian grand ayatollahs
Iranian people of Iraqi descent
People from Najaf
People from Gorgan